Statistics of Allsvenskan in season 1960.

Overview
The league was contested by 12 teams, with IFK Norrköping winning the championship.

League table

Results

Footnotes

References 

Allsvenskan seasons
Sweden
Sweden
1